William Tagg (19 November 1887 – 27 February 1962) was a British wrestler. He competed in the men's freestyle featherweight at the 1908 Summer Olympics.

References

External links
 

1887 births
1962 deaths
British male sport wrestlers
Olympic wrestlers of Great Britain
Wrestlers at the 1908 Summer Olympics
Place of birth missing